The Great Works Dam was a dam on the Penobscot River between Old Town and Bradley in Penobscot County, Maine, USA. The original Great Works Dam was constructed in the 1830s and replaced between 1887 and 1900. The dam was originally owned by the Penobscot Chemical Fibre Company and was acquired by Diamond International Corporation in 1968 along with the adjacent mill. The dam and powerhouse were sold several more times, and in 2010 the Penobscot River Restoration Trust bought the dam from PPL Corporation based on an agreement that was signed in 2004. On June 11, 2012, deconstruction of the dam began
as a part of an extensive project involving four dams to restore eleven species of sea-run fish to the Penobscot River.

References

Dams in Maine
Penobscot River
Buildings and structures in Old Town, Maine
Dams completed in 1900
Former dams